Sibangea is a plant genus of the family Putranjivaceae, first described as a genus in 1883. It is sometimes included in Drypetes. It is native to central Africa.

Species
 Sibangea arborescens Oliv. - Cameroon, Gabon
 Sibangea pleioneura Radcl.-Sm. - Tanzania
 Sibangea similis (Hutch.) Radcl.-Sm. - Cameroon, Gabon, Nigeria

References

Putranjivaceae
Malpighiales genera
Flora of Africa